Januario Galut was a Tingguian Igorot who led the 33rd Infantry Regiment of United States Volunteers under Major Peyton March so that they could surround and defeat 60 Filipinos led by General Gregorio del Pilar in the Battle of Tirad Pass.

After the war between Americans and Filipinos broke out, the Igorot - mountain inhabitants from the Cordilleras of northern Luzon - sent a contingent of their men to fight the Americans at Caloocan. Armed only with spears, axes, and shields, they decided not to fight against Americans with rifles and artillery. The group soon fell out of the Philippine Army and allied with the Americans, acting as guides for the American troops in highlands of northern Luzon.

Galut has been considered a traitor among Filipinos.  The Igorot people, of which Galut was one, were also subject to much discrimination by lowlanders so it has been questioned why they should have felt loyalty to the revolutionary government.

The only documentation linking him to the above action is in the testimony of the U.S. Texas Regiment which participated in the battle.

References

Further reading
"The Igorrote Tribe From the Philippines",Lewis and Clark Journal 4, no. 4 (October 1905) was released to the public.

External links
  Informative read about the Tingguians.

People from Benguet
Igorot people
People of the Philippine–American War
Year of death missing
Year of birth missing